Dalayna Hewitt (born December 15, 2000) is an American tennis player.

Hewitt has a career-high singles ranking of 401 by the WTA, achieved on 19 September 2022. She also has a career-high WTA doubles ranking of 364, achieved on 19 September.

Hewitt made her WTA Tour main-draw debut at the 2022 Tennis in the Land after qualifying for the singles tournament. She also received a wildcard for the doubles main draw with Peyton Stearns.

ITF finals

Singles

Doubles

Junior Grand Slam finals

Doubles: 1 (runner-up)

References

External links

2000 births
Living people
American female tennis players
21st-century American women